Tirupayathangudi Tirupayatrunathar Temple
( ) is a Hindu temple located at Tirupayathangudi  in Nagapattinam district, Tamil Nadu, India. The historical name of the place is Tirupayattrur.The temple is dedicated to Shiva, as the moolavar presiding deity, in his manifestation as Tirupayatrunathar. His consort, Parvati, is known as Kavianganni.

Significance 
It is one of the shrines of the 275 Paadal Petra Sthalams - Shiva Sthalams glorified in the early medieval Tevaram poems by Tamil Saivite Nayanar Tirunavukkarasar.

Literary mention 
Tirunavukkarasar describes the feature of the deity as:

References

External links 
 
 

Shiva temples in Nagapattinam district
Padal Petra Stalam